Gary Myers may refer to:

 Gary A. Myers (born 1937), U.S. Representative from Pennsylvania
 Gary Myers (writer) (born 1952), American writer of fantasy and horror
 Gary Myers (actor) (born 1941), British actor
 Gary Myers (lawyer) (born 1944), American lawyer